Franklin High School is a public high school located in Elk Grove, California, United States. It is officially accredited by the Western Association of Schools and Colleges (WASC).

History of the town of Franklin

In 1856, the town of Franklin was founded by an enterprising gentleman named Andrew George, who established the town fourteen miles south of Sacramento on Lower Stockton Road. Now known as Franklin Boulevard, this had been the main road from Sutter's Fort to the Mexican capital of Monterey. During the Gold Rush, this road became the stage route to Stockton.

George did not originally name the town Franklin, as it is known today. He called it "Georgetown", after himself, and the post office there was known by that name. The hotel he built was, however, given the name "Franklin House" in honor of his mother's family, the Franklins.

Campus
Franklin High School shares its campus with Toby Johnson Middle School and the Franklin Community Library. As well as their academic program, Franklin High School offers the STEAM academy, the GREEN academy, AVID, the athletic department, and Visual and Performing Arts (VAPA).

Athletics
Franklin High School offers a variety of athletics including Baseball, Softball, Girls' and Boys' Basketball, Cheer, Cross Country, Diving, Football, Girls' and Boys' Golf, Girls' and Boys' Soccer, Swim, Girls' and Boys' Tennis,  Track, Girls' and Boys' Volleyball, Water Polo, and Wrestling.

References

External links

Official Website
Athletics
Media Communications
School Loop
Wildcat Communications Media Center

High schools in Sacramento County, California
Public high schools in California
Elk Grove, California
2002 establishments in California